McCulloh is a surname. Notable people with the surname include:

 Douglas McCulloh (born 1959), American photographer
 James W. McCulloh (1789–1861), American politician, father of Richard Sears McCulloh
 Richard Sears McCulloh (1818–1894), American civil engineer and professor, uncle of James Sears McCulloh
 James Sears McCulloh (1868–1957), American executive, grandson of James W. McCulloh
 Thayne McCulloh (born 1964), American social psychologist

See also
McCulloh, California, unincorporated community
McCulloh Street, state route in Maryland